Erin Grall (born June 30, 1977) is an American politician who has served in the Florida House of Representatives from the 54th district since 2016.

References

1977 births
Living people
Republican Party members of the Florida House of Representatives
Women state legislators in Florida
21st-century American politicians
21st-century American women politicians